Art in the Age of Automation is the fourth studio album by Portico Quartet. It was released on 25 August 2017.

Track listing 
All songs written by Duncan Bellamy and Jack Wyllie.
 Endless – 4:27
 Objects to Place in a Tomb – 5:27
 Rushing – 6:19
 Art in the Age of Automation – 4:55
 S/20005S – 0:37
 A Luminous Beam – 6:02
 Beyond Dialogue – 6:42
 RGB – 4:32
 Current History – 6:07
 Mercury Eyes – 1:36
 Lines Glow – 3:49

Untitled (AITAOA #2) 
On 9 March 2018, the band announced the release of a companion piece to Art in the Age of Automation, called "Untitled (AITAOA #2)" and featuring tracks recorded during the Art in the Age of Automation sessions. It is due to be released on 27 April.

 Double Space - 2:53
 Index - 3:58
 Unrest - 5:13
 In Where We Meet - 1:16
 View from a Satellite - 5:20
 Celestial Wife - 3:58
 Reflected in Neon - 2:22
 Dust - 4:46
 Berlin - 2:02

Personnel 
 All instruments played by Portico Quartet except strings on 1, 2, 4, 6 and 11, performed by Francesca Ter-Burg and Anisa Arslanagic and additional bass on 2 and 7 by Tom Herbert.
 Mixed by Portico Quartet and Greg Freeman, assisted by Beau Blaise
 Mixed at Vox-Ton Studios, Berlin and Mokik Studio, Berlin, February 2017
 Mastered by Norman Nitzsche, CALYX Mastering, Berlin, May 2017
 Artwork by Duncan Bellamy for veilprojects.com

Charts

References 

2017 albums
Portico Quartet albums